The Challenge: Champs vs. Pros is a special mini-series of MTV's long-running reality game show, The Challenge. In the six-week event, ten Challenge greats competed against ten professional athletes. The series premiered on Tuesday, May 16, 2017, and concluded on June 20, 2017. The series was hosted by NFL wide receiver Victor Cruz. Contestants competed to win $50,000 to donate to the charity of their choice. In 2017 the series format was changed to include celebrities and was renamed Champs vs. Stars.

The format featured alumni from The Real World, Road Rules, and The Challenge, competing with athletes who have participated in professional leagues and events such as the National Football League, Women's National Basketball Association, Ultimate Fighting Championship, World Surfing Championship, along with the Winter and Summer Olympics.

Contestants

Charity money shared

Gameplay

Challenge games
Against the Ropes: Similar to the original challenge "Piggy Back" from Free Agents, teams are separated into two groups of five. Then, each group has to advance on hanging ropes from one platform to another that is suspended above water. After one player advances onto one rope, the next teammate has to use the first player as a "human bridge" in order to advance to the next rope. Subsequent players will continue the process, until each player is hanging into their own rope, at which point, players will continue to use their teammates as "human bridges" in order to reach the opposite platform. The team that gets the most players across wins.
Winners: Pros
Tailgate BBQ: Similar to the original challenge "Sausage Party" from Free Agents, players have to roll themselves along a "barbecue-style" obstacle course, while covered in shrink wrap. Each player will wiggle and roll through a variety of "condiments" and on oversize metal bars that resemble a grill grate, and toward place mats with hot dog labels on them. Certain players from each team will have to hold a "chip" bag in their mouth. If they do not hold it in their mouth the entire way through, a two-minute penalty will be added to their team total. The team with the shortest time wins.
Winners: Champs
Out of Bounds: Similar to the original challenge "Pole Push" from The Gauntlet III, played in same-sex heats, a pole is situated in the middle of a large rectangular pit surrounded by water. Pros and Champs will go head to head to try to push their opponent into the water. The team with the most points at the end wins.
Winners: Pros
 Keep Your Eyes On The Prize: Similar to the original challenge "Don't Forget About Me" from Battle of the Exes II, teams will have to split up into groups. One team member will lift up a steel door out of the sand that is connected to a memory puzzle for as long as they can. Two other team members will try to memorize one row at a time. Those two team members will tell another two team members what the row combination is. Those two people will then sprint to their last team member and tell them what the row is. If the row is wrong, they will have to take that whole row down and restart that row. The team who finishes first wins.
 Winners: Champs
 Over the Line: Similar to the original challenge "Reaching Out" from The Duel.
 Winners: Champs
 No Guts No Glory: Played individually and in two heats – one for guys and one for girls – players must select a plate of food they would like to eat – either an entree, side dish or dessert – to earn a colored ball. Balls are worth different numbers of points depending on which table they came from with entrees worth the most and desserts worth the least. Once a player has a ball, they must shoot it into a hoop at the far end of the course. The top guy and girl from each team will be declared the winners and advance to the finals together as a pair. The next best individual finisher will also earn a spot in the final, along with a member of their choosing from their own team.
 Winners: Camila, Cara Mara, Darrell, Kamerion and Lindsey
 Chosen to run the final: Wes
 Eliminated: CT, Gus, Lolo and Louise

Arena games
Pull No Punches: Similar to the original "Wrecking Wall" from Free Agents, each player must punch through a 30-foot dry wall to make holes so they can climb up until they can reach a bell. The first player to ring the bell wins the elimination round.
Played by: Ashley M. vs. Veronica and Candice vs. Lolo
Blindsided: Similar to the original "Snapper" from Rivals II, played within a large circle, players have to swing and break a wooden stick at their opponent, while blindfolded. The blindfolded players will be wearing bells on their shoes and guided by their partners, who are standing outside of the circle. The player that breaks a stick on their opponent two times, wins the elimination.
Played by: CM Punk vs. Shawne and Johnny vs. Wes
Basket Brawl: Similar to the original "Balls In" from The Inferno II, Free Agents, and Invasion of the Champions, each player will be given five chances to get as many balls inside a barrel, located in the middle of a large circle. If a player is either knocked out of or steps out of the ring, or if the ball is knocked out of the ring, their ball is considered "dead." Players will alternate between offense and defense in each round. To make things harder, the barrel is elevated and they are given a medicine ball.
Played by: Ashley K. vs. Ashley M. and Lolo vs. Tia
 Ice Bath: Similar to the original "Chill Out" from Rivals III, players will have to submerge their arms into a bucket full of ice water for 1 minute. They will then have to unlock a series of locks to reveal a slide puzzle. They will then have to solve the puzzle. If the puzzle is not unlocked or solved within 2 minutes, they will then have to submerge their arms in the ice bucket again for another minute. The first player to solve their puzzle first wins.
 Played by: CM Punk vs. Gus and Jordan vs. Wes
 Going the Distance: Similar to "Spool" from The Ruins and "Knot So Fast" from Battle of the Seasons (2012) and Invasion of the Champions, players have to untangle two-hundred feet of heavy rope from a low rectangular structure. The first to untangle their rope wins.
 Played by: Louie vs. Wes and Ashley M. vs. Lolo

Game summary

Episode progress

Teams
 The contestant is on the Champs team.
 The contestant is on Pros team.
Competition
 The contestant won the final challenge.
 The contestant did not win the final challenge.
 The contestant was the winning team captain and was safe from the Arena.
 The contestant won the challenge and advanced to the final challenge.
 The contestant was chosen to go to the final by one of their teammates.
 The contestant was not selected for the Arena.
 The contestant won in the Arena.
 The contestant won in the Arena against a member of the opposite team.
 The contestant lost in the Arena and was eliminated.
 The contestant lost in the Arena against a member of the opposite team and was eliminated.
 The contestant didn't win the challenge and wasn't picked to be in the final challenge and was eliminated.

Voting progress

Episodes

After filming

Subsequent Challenges

Challenge in bold indicates that the contestant was a finalist on The Challenge.

Notes

References

External links
 

The Challenge (TV series)
2010s American reality television series
Television shows set in Los Angeles
2017 American television series debuts
2017 American television series endings
Television shows filmed in Los Angeles
Celebrity reality television series
Reality television spin-offs